The 2020 DPA Tour consisted of 6 darts tournaments on the 2020 PDC Pro Tour.

Owing to the COVID-19 pandemic, the DPA Tour was curtailed to just 6 events.

Prize money
Each event had a prize fund of A$5,000.

This is how the prize money is divided:

January

DPA Tour 1
DPA Tour 1 was contested on Friday 31 January 2020 at the Warilla Bowls and Recreation Club in Barrack Heights.

February

DPA Tour 2
DPA Tour 2 was contested on Saturday 1 February 2020 at the Warilla Bowls and Recreation Club in Barrack Heights.

DPA Tour 3
DPA Tour 3 was contested on Sunday 2 February 2020 at the Warilla Bowls and Recreation Club in Barrack Heights.

March

DPA Tour 4
DPA Tour 4 was contested on Friday 6 March 2020 at the Pine Rivers Darts Club in Brisbane.

DPA Tour 5
DPA Tour 5 was contested on Saturday 7 March 2020 at the Pine Rivers Darts Club in Brisbane.

DPA Tour 6
DPA Tour 6 was contested on Sunday 8 March 2020 at the Pine Rivers Darts Club in Brisbane.

References

2020 in darts
2020 PDC Pro Tour